The women's singles competition at the 2022 FIL European Luge Championships was held on 23 January 2022.

Results
The first run was held at 09:43 and the second run at 11:10.

References

Women's singles